HAMK Häme University of Applied Sciences  is an institution of higher education with seven locations in Finland. Its programmes are coordinated with industry and commerce. HAMK also offers research and development services, professional teacher education, further and continuing education and studies in the Open University of Applied Sciences.

HAMK operates at seven locations: Evo, Forssa, Hämeenlinna, Lepaa, Mustiala, Riihimäki and Valkeakoski. There are approximately 8,000 students and 600 staff members.

Degree programmes 
HAMK offers bachelor-level and master-level degree programmes in six fields of study: Culture; Natural Resources and the Environment; Natural Sciences; Social Services, Health and Sports; Technology, Communication and Transport; and Social Sciences, Business and Administration.

Eight bachelor-level programmes are taught in English:

 Computer Applications
 Construction Engineering
 Electrical and Automation Engineering
Information and Communication Technology, Bioeconomy
 International Business
 Mechanical Engineering and Production Technology
 Smart and Sustainable Design
Smart Organic Farming

In addition, two master-level programmes, Business management and entrepreneurship and Sustainable Technologies, is taught in English.

Bachelor's degree studies comprises basic and professional studies, optional studies, work placement and a Bachelor's thesis. The extent of the studies is 210–240 ECTS credits and the duration is 3.5 to 4 years.

References

External links
Official website

Universities and colleges in Finland